The 1999 Men's European Volleyball Championship was the 21st edition of the event, organized by Europe's governing volleyball body, the Confédération Européenne de Volleyball. It was hosted in two cities in Austria – Wiener Neustadt and Vienna – from September 7 to September 12, 1999.

Teams

Group A – Wiener Neustadt
 
 
 

Group B – Vienna

Preliminary round

Group A

Tuesday September 7

Wednesday September 8

Thursday September 9

Group B

Tuesday September 7

Wednesday September 8

Thursday September 9

Final round

Saturday September 11

Sunday September 12

Saturday September 11

Sunday September 12

Final ranking

References
 CEV Results
 Results
 Czech Results

1999
European Championships,Men
1999 in Austrian sport
European Championships,Men
Sports competitions in Vienna
1999,European Volleyball Championships,Men
September 1999 sports events in Europe